Austin Krajicek (born June 16, 1990) is an American professional tennis player. He has a career-high ATP ranking in doubles of World No. 9 achieved on 7 November 2022 and in singles of World No. 94 achieved on October 26, 2015. He is a distant cousin of Dutch tennis player and former Wimbledon champion Richard Krajicek and his sister, Michaëlla Krajicek. He played college tennis at Texas A&M.

College
Krajicek attended Texas A&M, where he lettered from 2008–11. He won the doubles title with Jeff Dadamo at the 2011 NCAA Division I Tennis Championships, which was the first national title in program history.
 
He was a four-time doubles All-American (2008–11), and a two-time singles All-American (2010 & 2011). Krajicek was the Big 12 Freshman of the Year, and in his junior and senior seasons was the Big 12 Player of the Year.

Professional career

Early years: 2012-2017
Prior to 2018 Krajicek competed mainly on the ITF Futures and ATP Challenger Tour, both in singles and doubles.

2018-20: First ATP title, Top 50 debut
Krajicek reached the quarterfinals of the 2018 US Open doubles tournament partnering Tennys Sandgren, his best showing at a Grand Slam in doubles. He entered the top 50 in doubles reaching a career-high of No. 44 on 22 October 2018. He later reached the top 40 with a career-high of World No. 35 on 27 May 2019.

He reached the third round of the 2020 Australian Open partnering Franko Škugor and the pair also won the title at the 2020 Austrian Open in Kitzbühel.

2021-22: Major final, Olympics, American No. 2 & World No. 9, ATP Finals
Partnering Vasek Pospisil, he reached his tenth final at the 2021 Hall of Fame Open where he lost to fellow Americans Jack Sock and William Blumberg.

At the Olympics, he reached the semifinals partnering again with Tennys Sandgren where they lost to eventual champions Mate Pavic and Nikola Mektic. The pair lost subsequently in the bronze medal match to the New Zealand pair of Marcus Daniell and Michael Venus.

Partnering with Steve Johnson, he reached his first Masters 1000 final at the 2021 Western & Southern Open in Cincinnati defeating No. 3 seeded Colombian pair Juan Sebastián Cabal and Robert Farah in a tight three-set match. The pair last competed at the 2020 edition of the Cincinnati Masters where they reached the semifinals.

With new partner Ivan Dodig, he reached the final at the 2021 Winston-Salem Open and won the title at the 2022 ATP Lyon Open.

At the 2022 French Open he reached his first Grand Slam final in his career also partnering with Dodig defeating en route World No. 1 and No. 2 and top seeds Joe Salisbury and Rajeev Ram and saving five match points in the quarterfinals. They lost to Marcelo Arevalo and Jean Julien Rojer in the final. As a result he made his debut in the top 25 and became the American No. 2 player after Rajeev Ram.

At the 2022 Halle Open and the 2022 Eastbourne International he reached the semifinals with Dodig. As a result he reached the top 20 at World No. 19 in the doubles rankings on 27 June 2022, and a couple of weeks later the top 15 on 11 July 2022.

At the ATP 500 2022 Citi Open, he reached his 15th final. Then he reached his 16th at the 2022 Firenze Open defeating Nicolas Mahut and Édouard Roger-Vasselin.
At the 2022 Tennis Napoli Cup he won his second title with Dodig as a team defeating home favorites Lorenzo Sonego / Andrea Vavassori to reach their fifth final of 2022 and Australian duo Matthew Ebden/John Peers in the final.
He reached his third straight and sixth final for the season with Dodig at the ATP 500 2022 Swiss Indoors in Basel defeating top seeds Arevalo/Rojer and the Kazakhstani duo of Andrey Golubev and Aleksandr Nedovyesov en route. The team won their third title together defeating Mahut/Roger-Vasselin.

At the 2022 Rolex Paris Masters the pair Dodig/Krajicek reached the semifinals defeating Belgian pair Sander Gille/Joran Vliegen and top seeds Rajeev Ram/Joe Salisbury to reach their seventh final for the season climbing to World No. 9 and World No. 10 respectively. On 5 November, the pair qualified for the 2022 ATP Finals after defeating German duo Kevin Krawietz and Andreas Mies to reach their seventh final of 2022 as a team and eight for Dodig.  Krajicek reached world No. 9 in the rankings on 7 November 2022 and finished the year ranked No. 10 on 21 November 2022.

World TeamTennis

Krajicek made his World TeamTennis debut in 2020 with the Orange County Breakers at The Greenbrier.

Significant finals

Grand Slam finals

Doubles: 1 (1 runner-up)

Masters 1000 finals

Doubles: 2 (2 runner-ups)

Olympic medal matches

Doubles: 1 (4th place)

ATP career finals

Doubles: 20 (8 titles, 12 runner-ups)

Challenger and Futures finals

Singles: 12 (8–4)

Doubles: 51 (32–19)

Record against other players

Record against top 10 players
Krajicek's match record against those who have been ranked in the top 10. Players who have been No. 1 are in boldface.

 Kevin Anderson 1–2
 Marcos Baghdatis 0–1
 Tomáš Berdych 0–1
 Pablo Carreño Busta 0–1
 John Isner 0–1
 Stan Wawrinka 0–1
 Kei Nishikori 0–2

* .

References

External links
 
 
 
 
 
 

1990 births
Living people
American male tennis players
American people of Czech descent
Sportspeople from Bradenton, Florida
Tennis players from Tampa, Florida
Texas A&M Aggies men's tennis players
Tennis players at the 2020 Summer Olympics
Olympic tennis players of the United States